Harana or Valle de Arana is a municipality located in the province of Álava, in the Basque Country, northern Spain. Its capital is the village of Alda.

Geography

Administrative subdivisions 
The municipality is divided into 4 villages, all of them organized as concejos.

References

External links
 

Municipalities in Álava